Hymenophyllum moorei is a rare species of filmy fern in the family Hymenophyllaceae. It is endemic to the high cloud forest at Mount Gower and Mount Lidgbird at Lord Howe Island. A small epiphytic fern found usually on tree trunks and fallen logs.

References

Endemic flora of Lord Howe Island
Epiphytes
moorei
Ferns of Australia
Taxa named by John Gilbert Baker
Plants described in 1874